Mirage, in comic, may refer to:
 Danielle Moonstar, an X-Men superheroine who sometimes uses the codename Mirage
 Mirage (DC Comics), the Batman minor supervillain Mike and the Teen Titan superheroine Miriam Delgado
 Mirage (Marvel Comics), the Spider-Man supervillain Desmond Charne
 Mirage (Image Comics), a Haunt supporting character and secret agent
 Mirage Studios

See also
Mirage (disambiguation)